Airavat may refer to:

INS Airavat (L24), a Landing Ship Tank of the Indian Navy
The code name for the Airborne Surveillance Platform, a prototype/experimental Indian early warning aircraft design

See also
Airavata, the mythical elephant king and the mount of Indra in Hinduism
Airavt (born 1992), performer